Irishtown or Irish Town may refer to the following places:

Australia
 Irishtown, Victoria - a ghost town in the Gippsland region
 Irishtown, Western Australia
 Irishtown, Tasmania

Canada
 Irishtown, New Brunswick
 Irishtown-Summerside, Newfoundland and Labrador
 Irishtown, Nova Scotia
 Irishtown, Prince Edward Island

Ireland
 Irishtown, County Mayo, village
 Irishtown, Dublin, inner suburb
 Irishtown Stadium in the suburb
 Irishtown, Kilkenny, former borough
 Irishtown (Parliament of Ireland constituency) for the borough
 Irishtown, Limerick, inner city area
 Irishtown, Mullingar, a townland in Mullingar civil parish, barony of Moyashel and Maheradermon, County Westmeath
 Irishtown, Rathconrath, a townland in Rathconrath civil parish, barony of Rathconrath, County Westmeath

United Kingdom, Northern Ireland
 Irishtown, County Antrim, see List of townlands in County Antrim

United States
 Any of the various Irish and Irish-American communities and neighborhoods in the United States may be and have been referred to as "Irishtowns" (see List of Irish-American communities)
 Irishtown, California
 Irish Town, California
 Irishtown Township, Clinton County, Illinois

Other
 Irish Town, Gibraltar

See also
 Lists of towns in Ireland
 Irishtown Bend, Cleveland, Ohio